Paul Edmund Bierley (February 3, 1926 – April 9, 2016) was an American music historian. Among his awards were a Society for American Music Lifetime Achievement Award and receiving an Honorary Doctor of Music from Ohio State University.

Career
During World War II era, he was a B-25 bomber radio operator and gunner for the Army Air Forces and served in the United States. He was stationed at Westover Air Force Base and played in the Army Air Forces band. He married Pauline in 1948. He graduated with a degree in aeronautical engineering from Ohio State University in 1953, and worked for North American Aviation and Ellanef Manufacturing.

Bierley later began an active musical career. He conducted extensive research on John Philip Sousa and wrote books about him, Henry Fillmore, and historical books about music. He wrote liner notes for album and CDs and magazine articles. He portrayed Uncle Sam at band concerts and lectured on musical subjects. Bierley founded Integrity Research Foundation and Integrity Press.

He had relationships with local music organizations like Brass Band of Columbus, Columbus Symphony Orchestra, Detroit Concert Band, Wheeling Steel Band of Portsmouth, Ohio Village Brass, the Virginia Grand Military Band, as well as the North American Aviation Concert Band, the New Sousa Band, and the World Symphony Orchestra. He was a member of the Tubists Universal Brotherhood Association and the International Tuba and Euphonium Society.

Among his awards were a Society of American Music Lifetime Achievement Award and receiving an Honorary Doctor of Music from Ohio State University.

Personal life 
Paul Edmund Bierley, the son of William and Minnie Bierley, was born in 1926 in Portsmouth, Ohio. He married Pauline in 1948, with whom they had son John and daughter Lois. He lived much of his married life in Westerville, Ohio. Pauline died before Bierley, who died on April 9, 2016. His remains were donated to the Ohio State University College of Medicine.

Bibliography 
His notable books are:

 John Philip Sousa: American Phenomenon (1973); 
 The Music of Henry Fillmore and Will Huff (1982); 
 The Heritage Encyclopedia of Band Music, Composers and their music (2 Vol.s), by William Harold Rehrig (born 1939), Paul Bierley (1991); 
 Marching Along: Recollections of Men, Women and Music (1994); 
 The Incredible Band of John Philip Sousa (2010); 
 New England Families, Genealogical and Memorial

References

External links
 Paul E. Bierley, University of Illinois Library
 Paul Bierley, NAMM (National Association of Music Merchants) Oral History Interviews
   

1926 births
2016 deaths
Ohio State University College of Engineering alumni
Aerospace engineers
People from Portsmouth, Ohio
People from Westerville, Ohio
John Philip Sousa
Music historians
United States Army Air Forces soldiers
United States Army Air Forces personnel of World War II
Historians from Ohio